Comitas kayalensis is an extinct species of sea snail, a marine gastropod mollusc in the family Pseudomelatomidae.

Description

Distribution
This marine species is endemic to India and occurs off Cuddalore

References

kayalensis
Gastropods described in 1962